is a Japanese singer, actress, model, and radio personality associated with Up-Front Works. In 2002, she joined Hello! Project as a member of Hello! Project Kids and later debuted as one of the lead vocalist of the Japanese idol girl group Cute in 2005. Throughout her singing career, Suzuki also became a vocalist for the girl group Buono! From June 2015 onwards, she became an exclusive model for the fashion magazine Ray.

After Cute and Buono! disbanded in 2017, Suzuki left Hello! Project and debuted as a solo singer with the album Do Me a Favor, with "Distance" as its lead track.

Career

2002–2005: Hello! Project Kids, 4Kids, and Aa!

Having taken singing lessons since kindergarten, in 2002, Suzuki auditioned for Hello! Project Kids with the song "Kimochi wa Tsutawaru" by BoA. Her audition tape was aired on Morning Musume's variety show Hello! Morning. She was placed in the group with 14 other girls. She made her first appearance as an angel in the 2002 film Mini Moni ja Movie: Okashi na Daibōken!; she also was one of the featured artists in the movie's ending song as a member of 4Kids.

In 2003, Suzuki became a member of the subgroup Aa! along with Reina Tanaka from Morning Musume and Miyabi Natsuyaki. They released their first and only single, "First Kiss", on October 29, 2003. Later, in 2004, she participated in singing "All for One & One for All!", a collaboration single released by all Hello! Project artists under the name "H.P. All Stars." She also sang the coupling track, "Suki ni Naccha Ikenai Hito", with Tanaka and Megumi Murakami.

2005–2017: Cute and Buono!

In 2004, Berryz Kobo was created with the intention of rotating all of the members of Hello! Project Kids to make time for school., but the idea was later scrapped, and the remaining girls who were not chosen were rebranded under the name Cute on June 11, 2005. Suzuki became Cute's lead vocalist, and the group made their major label debut in 2007 with "Sakura Chirari."

In 2007, Suzuki also became part of the subgroup Buono! with Momoko Tsugunaga and Miyabi Natsuyaki from Berryz Kobo. The group formed to perform the opening and ending songs for the anime Shugo Chara! They released their first single, "Honto no Jibun", on October 31, 2007. After the show's end, Buono continued on as a side project until its disbandment in 2017. In 2013, Suzuki became part of the subgroup Dia Lady with Risako Sugaya for the Satoumi Movement. Dia Lady released the song "Lady Mermaid" on August 7, 2013, in a compilation album with other artists in the Satoumi Movement.

On April 21, 2015, Suzuki became an exclusive model for the fashion magazine Ray starting from the June edition. Since July 6, 2016, Suzuki has also hosted her own radio show, "Airi's Potion."

In 2016, Cute announced plans to disband in June 2017, citing interest in different career paths as their reason. Suzuki initially planned on modeling and becoming a newscaster but decided on continuing her singing career.

2018–present: Solo activities, Do Me a Favor

In April 2018, Suzuki announced her solo debut album, Do Me a Favor, which was set for release on June 6, 2018, and featured collaborations with bands Scandal, Akai Ko-en, and Spicy Chocolate. The album's lead single, "Distance", was released on May 3, 2018, to promote the album, along with music videos for "Distance", "Start Again", and "#DMAF." Do Me a Favor peaked at #6 on the Oricon Weekly Albums Chart. On the day of the album's release, Suzuki also released a music video for "Hikari no Hou e", her collaboration song with Akai Ko-en. Suzuki was announced as a musical guest at the Rakuten Girls Award Autumn/Winter 2018 fashion show.

In December 2019, Suzuki released her second album I. The album included the song "Break it Down", which was produced by Official Hige Dandism.

In April 2020, Suzuki appeared as a featured artist on Masayuki Suzuki's song "Daddy! Daddy! Do!", the theme song for the second season of Kaguya-sama: Love is War. In 2022, she sang "Heart wa Oteage", the ending theme for the show's third season.

Personal life
Suzuki is the daughter of professional golfers Toru Suzuki and Kyoko Maruya. Suzuki also has a younger brother. She graduated from Keio University in 2017 with a degree in Environmental Studies.
She is currently dating professional football player Ao Tanaka.

Discography

Studio albums

Live albums

Singles

As lead artist

As featured artist

Filmography

Film

Television

Theater

Radio

Solo DVDs

Publications

Photobooks 
  (May 19, 2007, Wani Books)
  (December 5, 2007, Kadokawa Group Publishing)
  (June 20, 2008, Wani Books)
  (June 25, 2009, Wani Books)
  (August 20, 2010, Wani Books)
  (May 23, 2011, Wani Books)
  (June 23, 2011, Wani Books)
  (June 25, 2012, Wani Books)
  (March 31, 2013, Wani Books)
  (August 20, 2013, Wani Books)
  (April 12, 2014, Wani Books)
  (March 31, 2017, Wani Books)
 nectar (November 17, 2022, Shufu no Tomo)

Digital photobooks 
  (2010.09.16)
 Cutest (Airi Version 2012.03.04)
 Koisuru Otome (A Girl in Love (2012.05.11)
  (2012.10.16)
  (2012.10.22)

Photo-essays 
 Suzuki Airi Perfect Book "Airi-aL" (Photographic essay, December 27, 2012, Wani Books)
 Eita × Suzuki Airi Eita Produce Magic Make-up (Photographic essay, May 20, 2013, Standard Magazine)
 Suzuki Airi Style Book "Airi-sT" (Photographic essay, November 27, 2014, Wani Books)
 OTONA STYLE BOOK "Airimania" (Photographic essay, May 23, 2017, Shufu no Tomo)

Tours
 Airi Suzuki Live Tour 2018 "Parallel Date" (2018)

Notes

References

External links 
 Airi Suzuki Official Website 
 Airi Mania Blog - Airi Suzuki Official Blog 
 

1994 births
Living people
Japanese idols
People from Gifu Prefecture
Japanese women pop singers
Hello! Project Kids members
Cute (Japanese idol group) members
Aa! members
Buono! members
Japanese female models
Keio University alumni
Musicians from Gifu Prefecture
21st-century Japanese singers
21st-century Japanese actresses
Actresses from Gifu Prefecture
Models from Gifu Prefecture
21st-century Japanese women singers